Urho Jonas Castrén (30 December 1886, in Jyväskylä – 8 March 1965, in Helsinki) was a judge, serving for 27 years as the President of the Supreme Administrative Court of Finland. During the constitutional crisis of 1944,  Castrén, representing the National Coalition Party, became Prime Minister of Finland for a brief period.

Biography
Urho Jonas Castrén was born 30 December 1886, in Jyväskylä to Johannes Castrén and Amanda Ulrika Jussilainen. He attended the Lyceum of Jyväskylä, completing his studies of the classics in 1904 and earning a legal degree in 1907. He took his Master of Laws in 1910 and obtained a degree in rights in 1912. Between 1918 and 1927 he taught at the Agriculture and Forestry division and Political Science Department of the Faculty of Law at the University of Helsinki as a specialty teacher.

He joined the law firm of Jonas Castrén and worked as an assistant from 1913 to 1914. In 1914, he became a legal counselor and a member of the Helsinki City Court, where he remained until 1917 when he transferred to the Residential Tax Assessor's office. He served on the assessor's Board of Directors between 1917 and 1922. Castrén entered the judiciary in 1922 first serving as Saarijärven judicial district judge until 1926, then as Deputy Chancellor of Justice between 1926 and 1928; Chancellor of Justice from 1928 to 1929; and finally as President of the Supreme Administrative Court from 1929 to 1956.

He was also Minister of Justice from December 1925 to December 1926.

Castrén formed a coalition government after Antti Hackzell became incapacitated. The main task of his government was enforcing the Moscow Armistice.

Castrén was the father of theologian Inga-Brita Castrén.

Cabinets
 Urho Castrén Cabinet

References

1886 births
1965 deaths
People from Jyväskylä
People from Vaasa Province (Grand Duchy of Finland)
National Coalition Party politicians
Prime Ministers of Finland
Ministers of Justice of Finland
Chancellors of Justice of Finland
World War II political leaders